The 2019 Toledo Rockets football team represented the University of Toledo during the 2019 NCAA Division I FBS football season. The Rockets were led by fourth-year head coach Jason Candle and played their home games at the Glass Bowl in Toledo, Ohio. They competed as members of the West Division of the Mid-American Conference (MAC). Although finishing their regular season with a bowl eligible 6–6 record, they were the only bowl-eligible team not invited to a bowl game.

Preseason

MAC media poll
The MAC released their preseason media poll on July 23, 2019, with the Rockets predicted to finish in first place in the West Division.

Schedule
Toledo's 2019 schedule will begin with four non-conference games, starting on August 31 on the road against Kentucky of the Southeastern Conference (SEC). The Rockets will then play at home against Murray State of the Ohio Valley Conference, on the road against Colorado State of the Mountain West Conference, and finally at home against BYU, a football independent. In Mid-American Conference play, they will play home games against Western Michigan, Eastern Michigan, Kent State, and Northern Illinois; and road games against Bowling Green, Ball State, Buffalo, and Central Michigan. Toledo will not play East Division members Akron, Miami, or Ohio as part of the regular season.

Source:

Game summaries

at Kentucky

Murray State

at Colorado State

BYU

Western Michigan

at Bowling Green

at Ball State

Eastern Michigan

Kent State

Northern Illinois

at Buffalo

at Central Michigan

References

Toledo
Toledo Rockets football seasons
Toledo Rockets football